"Ammunition" is a song by American alternative rock band Switchfoot. It was released to Christian rock radio on July 8, 2003, and peaked at number 11 on the Radio & Records Christian rock chart. At the 35th GMA Dove Awards, it received the award for Rock Recorded Song of the Year.

References

2003 singles
2003 songs
Switchfoot songs
Songs written by Jon Foreman
Sparrow Records singles